Manipontonia is a genus of shrimp comprising the following species:

Manipontonia paeneglabra Bruce, 2012
Manipontonia persiana Marin, 2010
Manipontonia psamathe (de Man, 1902)

References

Palaemonoidea